Major John Gellibrand Hubbard, 3rd Baron Addington OBE TD, JP (7 June 1883 – 20 June 1966) was a British Peer.

Life
Hubbard was the eldest son of Egerton Hubbard, 2nd Baron Addington, and succeeded to the Barony on the death of his father in 1915 and took his seat in the House of Lords.

He was commissioned a volunteer officer as a second lieutenant in the 1st Bucks Volunteers on 4 October 1902.

Arms

References

1883 births
1966 deaths
Officers of the Order of the British Empire
John 3